Guilherme Clezar was the current champion, and returned to defend his title, but lost in quarterfinals to Diego Schwartzman.

Diego Schwartzman won the title by defeating André Ghem 4–6, 6–4, 7–5 in the final.

Seeds

Draw

Finals

Top half

Bottom half

References
 Main Draw
 Qualifying Draw

Tetra Pak Tennis Cup - Singles
2014 Singles